Colotis, called orange tips or Arabs, is a genus of butterflies of the subfamily Pierinae found mainly in Africa and south-western Asia.  The larvae of all Colotis
species specialize on plants in the family Capparaceae.

Species
Listed alphabetically within subgroups:

Subgenus Colotis Hübner, [1819]:
Colotis amata (Fabricius, 1775) – topaz Arab or small salmon Arab
Colotis antevippe (Boisduval, 1836) – large orange tip or red tip
Colotis aurigineus (Butler, 1883) – African golden, Arab veined, or gold double-banded orange
Colotis aurora (Cramer, [1780]) – plain orange tip
Colotis auxo (Lucas, 1852) – sulphur orange tip or yellow orange tip
Colotis celimene (Lucas, 1852) – lilac tip or magenta tip
Colotis chrysonome (Klug, 1829) – golden Arab
Colotis daira (Klug, 1829) – black-marked orange tip
Colotis danae (Fabricius, 1775) – scarlet tip or crimson tip
Colotis dissociatus (Butler, 1897)
Colotis doubledayi (Hopffer, 1862) – Doubleday's tip
Colotis elgonensis (Sharpe, 1891) – Elgon crimson tip
Colotis ephyia (Klug, 1829)
Colotis erone (Angas, 1849) – coast purple tip
Colotis etrida (Boisduval, 1836) – (small) orange tip
Colotis eucharis (Fabricius, 1775) – plain orange tip or sulphur orange tip
Colotis euippe (Linnaeus, 1758) – round winged orange tip
Colotis eunoma (Hopffer, 1855) – three spot crimson tip
Colotis evagore (Klug, 1829) – desert orange tip, small orange tip or tiny orange tip
Colotis evanthe (Boisduval, 1836) – Madagascar orange-tip
Colotis evanthides (Holland, 1896)
Colotis evenina (Wallengren, 1857) – common orange tip
Colotis fausta (Olivier, 1804) – (large) salmon Arab
Colotis guenei (Mabille, 1877) – Madagascar red-tip
Colotis halimede (Klug, 1829) – yellow patch, white orange patch white, white and orange Halimede, or dappled white
Colotis hetaera (Gerstaecker, 1871) – crimson tip or coast purple tip
Colotis hildebrandti (Staudinger, 1885) – golden tip
Colotis incretus (Butler, 1881)
Colotis ione (Godart, 1819) – Bushveld purple tip, (common) purple tip or violet tip
Colotis lais (Butler, 1876)
Colotis liagore (Klug, 1829)
Colotis mananhari (Ward, 1870) – chevron white
Colotis pallene (Hopffer, 1855) – Bushveld orange tip
Colotis phisadia (Godart, 1819) – blue-spotted Arab or variable colotis
Colotis protractus Butler, 1876
Colotis pleione (Klug, 1829) – orange patch white
Colotis protomedia (Klug, 1829) – yellow splendour
Colotis regina (Trimen, 1863) – large violet tip, regal purple tip, or queen purple tip
Colotis rogersi (Dixey, 1915) – Rogers' orange tip
Colotis ungemachi (Le Cerf, 1922)
Colotis venosa (Staudinger, 1885) – no patch white
Colotis vesta (Reiche, 1849) – veined orange, veined tip, or veined golden Arab
Colotis vestalis (Butler, 1876) – white Arab
Colotis zoe (Grandidier, 1867) – violet-tip
Subgenus Teracolus (Swainson, 1833):
Colotis eris (Klug, 1829) – banded gold tip or black-barred gold tip
Colotis subfasciatus (Swainson, 1833) – lemon traveller or lemon tip
Subgenus Cuneacolotis (Henning et al., 1997):
Colotis agoye (Wallengren, 1857) – speckled sulphur tip
Subgenus Gideona (Klots, 1933):
Colotis lucasi (Grandidier, 1867) – giant orange-tip

Status unknown:
Colotis fallax (Wichgraf, 1913), described from East Africa

References

External links
Pteron Images
Seitz, A. Die Gross-Schmetterlinge der Erde 13: Die Afrikanischen Tagfalter. Plate XIII 16 et seq.

 
Butterflies of Africa
Pieridae genera
Taxa named by Jacob Hübner